This is a complete list of appearances by members of the professional playing squad of UE Lleida during the 2005–06 season.

2006
Lleida
Lleida
Lleida